Neil Devindra Bissoondath  (born April 19, 1955, in Arima, Trinidad and Tobago) is a Trinidadian-Canadian author who lives in Quebec City, Quebec, Canada. He is a noted writer of fiction. He is an outspoken critic of Canada's system of multiculturalism and is the nephew of authors V.S. Naipaul and Shiva Naipaul, grandson of Seepersad Naipaul, grandnephew of Rudranath Capildeo and Simbhoonath Capildeo, and cousin of Vahni Capildeo.

Life and career
Bissoondath attended St. Mary's College in Trinidad and Tobago, where he was born in Arima. Although he was from a Hindu tradition, he was able to adapt to a Catholic high school. He describes himself as not very religious and distrustful of dogma. In the early 1970s, political upheaval and economic collapse had created a climate of chaos and violence in the island nation.

In 1973, at the age of 18, Bissoondath left Trinidad and settled in Ontario, where he studied at York University and received a Bachelor of Arts in French in 1977. He then taught English and French at the Inlingua School of Languages and the Toronto Language Workshop. He won the McClelland and Stewart award and the National Magazine award, both in 1986, for the short story "Dancing". Bissoondath was interviewed by Ali Lakhani in the journal Rungh about his views on writing and life.

Awards
He won the Writers' Trust of Canada's Gordon Montador Award in 1995 for Selling Illusions.

Bissoondath has received honorary doctorates from Glendon College, York University and Université de Moncton. In 2010 he was made a Chevalier of the Ordre national du Québec. In 2012, he was awarded the NALIS (National Library of Trinidad and Tobago) Lifetime Literary Achievement Award.

Bibliography

Novels
A Casual Brutality – 1989
The Innocence of Age – 1993
The Worlds Within Her – 1999 (Nominated for a Governor General's Award)
Doing the Heart Good – 2002
The Unyielding Clamour of the Night – 2005
The Soul of All Great Designs – 2008

Novella
Postcards from Hell – 2009

Short story collections
Digging Up Mountains – 1987
On the Eve of Uncertain Tomorrows – 1991

Non-fiction
Selling Illusions: The Cult of Multiculturalism in Canada 1994

See also
 Capildeo family

References

External links
 Neil Bissoondath's entry in The Canadian Encyclopedia
 Neil Bissoondath biography  at NALIS.
 Nicholas Dinka, "Neil Bissoondath - Hard questions", Quill & Quire.

1955 births
Living people
Canadian Hindus
Canadian male novelists
Canadian people of Indian descent
Critics of multiculturalism
Trinidad and Tobago novelists
Trinidad and Tobago emigrants to Canada
Trinidad and Tobago Hindus
Writers from Quebec City
People from Arima
20th-century Canadian novelists
21st-century Canadian novelists
Trinidad and Tobago people of Indian descent
Trinidad and Tobago male writers
20th-century Canadian male writers
21st-century Canadian male writers
Academic staff of Université Laval
Officers of the Order of Canada
Naipaul family